This is a list of events in South African sport in 2000.

Boxing
 14 May - Mike Barnardo defeats Dan Jerlingh of the Czech Republic with a 5th round technical knockout in Hungary and wins the World Boxing Federation heavyweight title

Football (Rugby Union)
 19 November - The South Africa (Springboks)  beat Ireland 28-18 at Lansdowne Road, Dublin, Ireland

Football (Soccer)
 7 October - South Africa (Bafana Bafana) draws with France 0-0 in the Nelson Mandela Challenge held in Ellis Park Stadium, Johannesburg

See also
1999 in South African sport
2000 in South Africa
2001 in South African sport
List of years in South African sport

 
South Africa
South African Sport, 2000 In